Bobby Valentino (born Robert James Beckingham, 22 June 1954) is a British musician, violinist and singer.

Career
Born in Chatham, Kent, he adopted the stage name Bobby Valentino in 1975. Valentino's first success was as a founding member of The Fabulous Poodles, but he is most often recognised as the violinist and co-writer of the #1 hit single "Young at Heart", by The Bluebells.

After leaving the Fabulous Poodles in the early 1980s, Valentino was a member of the Electric Bluebirds before joining the Hank Wangford Band at the beginning of 1984. The British country band already included pedal steel guitarist B. J. Cole (Cochise) and former Liverpool Scene/Scaffold/ guitarist Andy Roberts. Soon after joining the Hank Wangford Band, Valentino was performing with them in a pub when members of The Bluebells heard his playing, and asked him to join them in recording Young at Heart.

In the five years that Valentino was part of Wangford's band they recorded three albums; filmed two TV series for Channel 4 – The A-Z of C&W and Big Big Country, which attracted audiences of between two and four million at a time when The Last Resort with Jonathan Ross was being watched by 750,000; performed and wrote an acclaimed and record breaking musical: C. H. A. P. S (Cowboy, Horseriding Acting Performance Studio) at the Theatre Royal, Stratford East (their previous record was held by Oh, What a Lovely War!); toured constantly all over the United Kingdom and Europe and made numerous other radio and television appearances. These included a TV special, Christmas in Strangeways showing the band in concert on Boxing Day with a captive audience in Manchester's Victorian jail.

Valentino's violin can be heard on tracks by artists including: Tom Petty & the Heartbreakers, Bob Geldof, The Alabama 3 and Shania Twain.  He is also an occasional member of Mark Knopfler's current band. He has contributed to many recordings by the British folk punk band The Men They Couldn't Hang as well as frequently appearing with them on stage. His own most recent band, Los Pistoleros, sees him teamed up once again with former Hank Wangford bandmates B. J. Cole and Martin Belmont. Valentino is lead singer and guitarist in addition to playing the violin.

A part-time actor and model, Valentino has performed in West End musical theatre: in Destry Rides Again with Alfred Molina and Jill Gascoigne and in C.H.A.P.S. at the Theatre Royal, Stratford East. Occasionally he can be seen in films and commercials, usually taking the part of Clark Gable.

Solo career
Valentino has released three solo albums.

You're in the Groove Jackson was recorded during 1990 in Livingstone Studios in Wood Green and GibsonWood Studios in Deptford and was released in 1991 on Big Life Records.  The Airplay was significant that many people thought he had had a hit but the distributors, Rough Trade Records went bankrupt the week it was due in the shops.

In 1996 You're Telling Me, which consisted of some new tracks and the best of You're in the Groove Jackson, was released by Vireo Records to critical acclaim and Valentino appeared at the 1996 South by Southwest music festival in Austin, Texas to launch the album.  Again, the record company had distribution difficulties.

The 2001 release, This is Murder, consisted of new tracks and previous recordings from the earlier recordings and appeared on E.M. Records.

All three titles are quotes from the Bob Hope and Bing Crosby film musical, Road to Rio.

A 4th album is due for release in June 2011 under the title of Pat-a-Cake, Pat-a-Cake – another quote from Crosby and Hope.

Valentino is currently working on an album of new material with the working title of 6 ft 3ins.

Legal actions
In 2002, Valentino won a court case against Robert Hodgens (aka Bobby Bluebell) of Scots pop band The Bluebells for unpaid royalties from his contribution to their 1993 hit "Young at Heart", co-written by Hodgens and Siobhan Fahey. Valentino's case hinged on convincing the judge that he, rather than Hodgens, had composed the song's distinctive violin part, and that the violin part made a significant enough difference to the song to be considered an original contribution. The song, first recorded by Bananarama in 1983, was then released by the Bluebells with the added violin part in 1984, reaching No. 8 in the UK Singles chart. Valentino was paid a session fee of £75. However his claim against Hodgens only dated back to the time of the single's 1993 re-release and chart-topping performance on the back of a high-profile Volkswagen TV commercial. The court case attracted media attention after Valentino performed the violin part in court to illustrate his point, convincing Mr Justice Floyd to rule in his favour and award him damages of £100,000. A subsequent appeal by Hodgens against the ruling was unsuccessful.

In 2008, Valentino brought an action against the American R&B singer Bobby Wilson (then billed as "Bobby Valentino") and his then record label Def Jam for "Passing off, Trade Mark infringement, and breach of contract, in relation to record sales, recorded content, and artist's live performances".

Discography
 Alabama 3 – "Wade into the Water" (2000) Violin
 Alabama 3– "Power in the Blood" (2003) Violin
 Any Trouble – "Wrong End of the Race" (1984) Violin
 Big Country – "Eclectic" (1996) Violin
 Bluebells – The Singles Collection (1993) Violin
 Bluebells – "Sisters" (1984) Fiddle
 Blues Band – "Brand Loyalty" (1982) Violin
 Billy Bragg – "Talking with the Taxman About Poetry" (1986) Violin
 Bronski Beat – "Truthdare Doubledare" (1986) Violin
 Sam Brown – "Stop" (1988) Violin
 Cactus Rain – "In Our Time" (1990) Violin
 The Christians – "Colours" (1990) Violin
 B.J. Cole – "Heart of the Moment" (1995) Violin, Viola
 B.J. Cole – "Trouble in Paradise" (2004) Violin
 Andrew Cunningham – "20 Golden Greats" (1990) Violin
 Electric Bluebirds – "Back on the Train" (1996) Fiddle, Vocals
 The Fabulous Poodles – "Fabulous Poodles" (1977) Violin, Mandolin, Vocals
 The Fabulous Poodles – "Mirror Stars" (1978) Violin, Mandolin, Vocals
 The Fabulous Poodles – "Unsuitable" (1978) Violin, Mandolin, Vocals
 The Fabulous Poodles – "Think Pink" (1979) Violin, Mandolin, Vocals
 The Fabulous Poodles – "His Masters Choice" (1995) Violin, Mandolin, Vocals
 The Grants – "Let's Dance" (1998) Violin, Mandolin, Jaws Harp
 Haysi Fantayzee – "Battle Hymns for Children Singing" (1983) Violin
 The Ferns – "The Falling Trees" (1999) Producer, Violin
 Lena Fiagbe – "Vision" (1994) Violin
 Holly Beth Vincent – "Holly & the Italians" (1982) Violin, Mandolin
 John Illsley -" Never Told a Soul" (1984) Violin
 Jah Shaka/Mad Professor -"Jah Shaka Meets Mad Profes.." (1984) Violin
 Patricia Kaas – "Tour de Charme" (1993) Violin, Vocals
 Patricia Kaas – "Je Te Dis Vous" (1994) Violin
 David Knopfler – Release (1983) Violin
 Mark Knopfler "Quality Shoe" & "Baloney Again" (2003) Violin, Mandolin
 Gasper Lawal – "Abio'sun n"i (1985) Violin
 Les Rita Mitsouko – "Les Rita Mitsouko Presentent the..." (1987) Violin
 "Live in London Vol.1" (1984) Violin, Vocals
 Los Pistoleros – "Trigger Happy" (2001) Violin, Vocals, Guitar
 Los Pistoleros – "Cult 45" (2004) Violin, Vocals, Guitar
 Nick Lowe & His Cowboy Outfit -"Nick Lowe & His Cowboy.." (1984) Fiddle
 Kirsty MacColl – What Do Pretty Girls Do? (1998) Violin
 Andy McCoy – "R'n’R Memorabilia" (2003) Violin
 Mad Professor – "Who Knows the Secret of the Master" (1987) Violin
 Mad Professor – "Captures Pato Banton" (1988) Violin
 Mad Professor – "A Caribbean Taste of Technology" (1985) Violin
 The Men They Couldn't Hang – "How Green Is The Valley" (1986) Violin, arranger
 The Men They Couldn't Hang – "Waiting for Bonaparte" (1988) Fiddle
 The Men They Couldn't Hang – "Silvertown" (1989) Fiddle
 The Men They Couldn't Hang -"Majestic Grill: The Best of..." (1998) Violin, Arranger
 The Men They Couldn’t Hang – “Cherry Red Jukebox” (2003) Violin
 The Men They Couldn’t Hang – "Smugglers And Bounty Hunters" (2005) Violin
 The Men They Couldn’t Hang – "Devil on the Wind" (2009) Violin
 Amanda Norman-Sell – "As Love is My Witness" (1996) Violin
 Amanda Norman-Sell – "Patsy Cline Review" (1995) Violins
 Sinéad O'Connor – The Lion and the Cobra" (1987) Violins
 Mike Oldfield -"Earth Moving" (1989) Violin
 Tom Petty & the Heartbreakers – "Pack up the Plantation" (1986) Violin
 The Proclaimers – "Hit the Highway" (1994) Fiddle
 Red Box – "Circle & The Square" (1986) Violin
 Redlands Palomino Co. – "By the Time You Hear This…" (2004) Violin
 Reno Brothers – "Smile" (1996) Producer, Violin
 Andy Roberts – "Loose Connections" (soundtrack) (1984) Violin, Mandolin
 The Style Council – "My Ever Changing Moods" (1984) Violin
 The Style Council – "Cafe Bleu" (1984) Violin
 The Style Council – "Complete Adventures of the Style..." (1998) Violin
 Hank Wangford – "C.H.A.P.S." (1985) Fiddle, Mandolin, Vocals
 Hank Wangford – "Stormy Horizons" (1990) Fiddle, Mandolin, Acoustic Guitar
 Bobby Valentino – "You're in the Groove Jackson" (1991) Vocals, Violin, Guitar, Viola, Mandolin, producer
 Bobby Valentino – "You're Telling Me" (1996) Vocals, producer, Violin, Guitar, Mandolin, Viola,
 Bobby Valentino –"This is Murder" (2001) Vocals, Violin, Guitar, Mandolin, Viola, producer
 Luke Vibert & BJ Cole – "Stop the Panic" (2000) Vocals, Violin Mandolin

References

External links
  Official website
 Lospistoleros at MySpace
 Hankwangford.com
 Andyrobertsmusic.com
 Bjcole.co.uk

1954 births
Living people
People from Chatham, Kent
British violinists
British male violinists
British country musicians
British session musicians
British country guitarists
21st-century violinists
21st-century British male musicians